Bennett Township is a township in Kingman County, Kansas, USA.  As of the 2000 census, its population was 705.

Geography
Bennett Township covers an area of 36.49 square miles (94.51 square kilometers).

Cities and towns
 Norwich

Adjacent townships
 Allen Township (north)
 Erie Township, Sedgwick County (northeast)
 Eden Township, Sumner County (east)
 Township No. 6, Harper County (southwest)
 Canton Township (west)
 Eagle Township (northwest)

Cemeteries
The township contains two cemeteries: Stitch and Upchurch.

Major highways
 K-2 (Kansas highway)
 K-42 (Kansas highway)

Airports and landing strips
 Norwich Landing Strip

References
 U.S. Board on Geographic Names (GNIS)
 United States Census Bureau cartographic boundary files

External links
 City-Data.com

Townships in Kingman County, Kansas
Townships in Kansas